Thicker than Water (original title: Blóðbönd []) is a 2006 Icelandic film about a man who finds out that his child is not actually his own.

Cast and characters
 Hilmar Jonsson as Pétur
 Margrét Vilhjálmsdóttir as Ásta
 Laufey Elísasdóttir as Anna
 Aaron Brink as Örn
 Elma Lisa Gunnarsdottir as Lilja

References

External links
 
 

2000s Icelandic-language films
2006 films
2006 drama films
Icelandic drama films